Nannie de Villiers (born Esmé de Villiers, 5 January 1976) is a former professional tennis player who represented South Africa. She was born in neighbouring Namibia but moved at a young age.

De Villiers made her début in 1993, at the small ITF Johannesburg tournament. She also played her next event in her native country, in Pretoria, winning the doubles event. Although she officially retired in 2003, she made a minor-comeback in 2007, entering the Cape Town event, losing in the first round singles and reaching the semifinals doubles. She never surpassed the singles qualifying stages at a Grand Slam tournament.

Despite never winning a WTA Tour singles title, she won four on the ITF Circuit, and 22 doubles titles there.

De Villiers retired from professional tennis in 2007.

WTA career finals

Doubles: 3 (1 title, 2 runner-ups)

ITF finals

Singles: 8 (4–4)

Doubles : 41 (22–19)

External links
 
 
 

Sportspeople from Windhoek
Afrikaner people
White Namibian people
South African female tennis players
1976 births
Living people
Wimbledon junior champions
Grand Slam (tennis) champions in girls' doubles
African Games medalists in tennis
African Games silver medalists for South Africa
Competitors at the 1995 All-Africa Games